Martin Roesch founded Sourcefire in 2001 and served as its Chief Technology Officer until the company was acquired by Cisco Systems on October 7, 2013 for $2.7B. Roesch now serves as CEO of Netography  which raised $45M in Series A funding in November 2021. A respected authority on intrusion prevention, detection technology, and forensics, he was responsible for the technical direction and product development efforts of Sourcefire and Cisco Security before he moved into board roles and VC roles with Decibel Partners. Martin, has industry experience in network security and embedded systems engineering. He is also the author and lead developer of the Snort Intrusion Prevention and Detection System which formed the foundation for the Sourcefire firewall and IDS/IPS systems. Snort is still developed by Cisco Systems today and remains the most-used open source IDS technology.

Martin has developed various network security tools and technologies, including intrusion prevention and detection systems, honeypots, network scanners, and policy enforcement systems, for organizations such as GTE Internetworking, Stanford Telecommunications, Inc., and the United States Department of Defense. Martin has been interviewed as an industry expert in multiple technology publications, as well as print and online news services such as MSNBC, Wall Street Journal, CNET, ZDNet, and Scientific American. He has written columns for both Forbes and Fast Company, has keynoted many conferences, including RSA Conference, and continues to engage in the security community to mentor other developers. He has also been interviewed for several books, such as Network Intrusion Detection: An Analyst's Handbook, Intrusion Signatures and Analysis, Maximum Security, Hacking Exposed, and others.

In 2022, Martin was named to Technical.ly's Real List of Engineers on the forefront of change, based on his new work with leading Netography. He has been outspoken in recent months about the fundamental issues with network security priorities being lost in the face of COVID-19 changes in how companies work, leading to the atomization of networks. 

In 2006, Martin was named as one of InformationWeek's 18 "Innovators and Influencers" and one of the Tech Council of Maryland's "Most Influential CTOs in Maryland." Martin has also been the recipient of the 2004 InfoWorld IT Heroes Innovator Award as well as winning the 2004 "40 Under 40" award from the Baltimore Business Journal.

Martin holds a B.S. in Electrical and Computer Engineering from Clarkson University. He is also the author of Daemonlogger.

References

External links 
Security Conversations "Down Memory Lane with Snort and Sourcefire Creator Marty Roesch"

American computer programmers
Living people
People associated with computer security
Clarkson University alumni
American chief technology officers
Year of birth missing (living people)